The Master of Darkness is the twelfth book in the award-winning Lone Wolf book series created by Joe Dever.  This is the final book in the Magnakai series.

Gameplay

Lone Wolf books rely on a combination of thought and luck. Certain statistics such as combat skill and endurance attributes are determined randomly before play (reading). The player is then allowed to choose which Magnakai disciplines or skills he or she possess. This number depends directly on how many books in the series have been completed ("Magnakai rank"). With each additional book completed, the player chooses one additional Magnakai discipline.

The final book in the Magnakai series further reveals the quirks of the Lone Wolf game system, including putting players who have not played through the previous books at a substantial disadvantage in terms of Magnakai skills and rank.  Nonetheless, it is still possible to triumph.

Plot

After his struggles in the plane of Daziarn, Lone Wolf finally recovers the last of the Lorestones and finds a Shadow Gate back to his home. Unfortunately, upon his return, he finds that considerable time has passed and that, in his absence, the Darklords have conquered much of Magnamund. Now with all of the Lorestones' wisdom absorbed within him, and the hopes of Sommerlund and all the free peoples of Magnamund on his shoulders, Lone Wolf must travel to the very heart of the Darklords' foul realm, to the infernal city of Helgedad, and confront Archlord Gnaag himself. The adventure culminates with a spectacular battle in Helgedad and the destruction of the Darklords' principal city.

External links
Gamebooks - Lone Wolf
Gamebooks - The Masters of Darkness
Project Aon - The Masters of Darkness

1988 fiction books
Lone Wolf (gamebooks)
Berkley Books books